Tropidomantinae is a subfamily of mantises in the new (2019) family Nanomantidae. Within the single tribe Tropidomantini there are six genera, distributed in Asia and the Pacific.

Tribes and Genera
The Mantodea Species File lists two tribes:
 tribe Epsomantini (monotypic)
 Epsomantis Giglio-Tos, 1915 (monotypic)
 tribe Tropidomantini
 Eomantis Giglio-Tos, 1915
 Oligocanthopus Beier, 1935 - monotypic O. ornata
 Pliacanthopus Giglio-Tos, 1927
 Sinomantis Beier, 1933 - monotypic S. denticulata
 Tropidomantis Stal, 1877

NB: Several genera, previously placed here, have now been moved to the Fulciniinae, Hapalomantinae and Nanomantinae.  Xanthomantis Giglio-Tos, 1915 is a synonym of Pliacanthopus (above).

References

Further reading

 
 

Nanomantidae
Mantodea subfamilies